Chrostosoma dhamis is a moth of the subfamily Arctiinae. It was described by William Schaus in 1920. It is found in Brazil.

References

Biodiversity Heritage Library

Chrostosoma
Moths described in 1920